Alan-a-Dale is a fictional outlaw associated with Robin Hood.

Alan-a-Dale may also refer to:
Alan-a-Dale (horse), a Thoroughbred racehorse who won the 1902 Kentucky Derby
"Alan A Dale" (Robin of Sherwood episode), an episode of the 1980s British television series Robin of Sherwood
Alan A. Dale, a cargo ship sunk during World War II

See also
Alan Dale (disambiguation)